Berishvili is a Georgian surname. Notable people with the surname include:
Givi Berishvili (born 1987), Georgian rugby union player
Mikheil Berishvili (born 1987), Georgian basketball player

Georgian-language surnames
Surnames of Georgian origin